Lemyra alleni is a moth of the family Erebidae. It was described by Thomas in 1990. It is found in Thailand.

References

alleni
Moths described in 1990